was a McDonnell Douglas DC-8-61, registered JA8061, on a domestic scheduled passenger flight from Fukuoka, Fukuoka Prefecture, to Tokyo in Japan. The airplane crashed 9 February 1982 on approach to Haneda Airport in Tokyo Bay, resulting in 24 fatalities. Flight 350 was the first crash for Japan Air Lines in the 1980s. The investigation traced the cause of the crash to the deliberate actions of the captain.

Flight

The crew consisted of 35-year-old Captain Seiji Katagiri (片桐 清二 Katagiri Seiji), 33-year-old First Officer Yoshifumi Ishikawa, and 48-year-old flight engineer Yoshimi Ozaki. The cause of the crash was traced to Katagiri's deliberate crashing of the plane.

One report states that the captain engaged the inboard engines' thrust-reversers in flight. Another report states that, during descent, Katagiri "cancelled autopilot, pushed his controls forward and retarded the throttles to idle." Ishikawa and Ozaki worked to restrain Katagiri and regain control. Despite their efforts, the DC-8's descent could not be completely checked and it touched down in shallow water 510 meters (1673 feet) short of the runway. During the crash, the cockpit section of the DC-8 separated from the rest of the fuselage and continued to travel for several meters before coming to a halt.

Among the 166 passengers and 8 crew, 24 died. Following the incident, Katagiri, one of the first people to take a rescue boat, told rescuers that he was an office worker to avoid being identified as the captain. Katagiri was later found to have paranoid schizophrenia prior to the incident, which resulted in his being ruled not guilty by reason of insanity. Investigators for the Japanese government attributed the incident to a lack of proper medical examinations which allowed Katagiri to fly.

Katagiri has since been released from psychiatric care and lives near Mount Fuji.

See also 

 Accidents and incidents involving the Douglas DC-8 family
 Aviation safety
 
 List of accidents and incidents involving commercial aircraft
 List of Japan Airlines incidents and accidents'
 Suicide by pilot

Specific incidents
 EgyptAir Flight 990
 Germanwings Flight 9525
 LAM Mozambique Airlines Flight 470
 Royal Air Maroc Flight 630
 SilkAir Flight 185

References

External links 
 Final Accident Report – Aircraft Accident Investigation Commission 

1982 crimes in Japan
Airliner accidents and incidents involving deliberate crashes
Accidents and incidents involving the Douglas DC-8
Aviation accidents and incidents in 1982
Aviation accidents and incidents in Japan
350
Mass murder in 1982
Haneda Airport
February 1982 events in Asia
Mass murder in Japan
Airliner accidents and incidents involving ditching